Charles Michael Sweeny (January 26, 1882 – February 27, 1963) was an American soldier of fortune, United States Army lieutenant colonel, French Foreign Legion officer, Polish army brigadier general, Royal Air Force (RAF) group captain, and journalist who fought in numerous conflicts in the 20th century. He recruited fellow Americans to fight in World War II prior to the United States entering the war.

Early life and family
He was born in San Francisco to Charles and Emeline Sweeny. Charles Sr. was the son of poor Irish immigrants, but made his fortune in mining in the region around Coeur d'Alene, Idaho (see Bunker Hill Mine and Smelting Complex). The family settled in nearby Spokane, Washington. A 1920 Associated Press article called Charles Jr. a "multimillionaire's son."

He graduated from the University of Notre Dame.

One nephew, Charles Francis Sweeny (1910–1993), was the first husband of Margaret Whigham; they married in 1933 and divorced in 1947. (Afterward, she married the Duke of Argyll and became Margaret Campbell, Duchess of Argyll.) He would later be instrumental in forming the Eagle Squadrons. Another nephew, Robert "Bob" Sweeny, was an accomplished golfer on both sides of the Atlantic, playing in numerous Masters Tournaments and winning the 1937 British Amateur Championship.

Career
Sweeny enrolled in the United States Military Academy at West Point in 1900, but was expelled not once but twice, in 1901 and, after being reinstated, in 1903.

He fought in several conflicts in Central and South America, including for Francisco I. Madero in Mexico and against José Santos Zelaya in Nicaragua and Cipriano Castro in Venezuela, according to his friend Ernest Hemingway.

Sweeny, by then married, fought in World War I, first with the French Foreign Legion in 1914. Starting as a private, he was eventually commissioned a lieutenant for conspicuous gallantry at the Second Battle of Champagne in September 1915, and later promoted to captain for capturing a German trench with just a dozen men, but was severely wounded. He was awarded the Legion of Honour. At his request, in 1917 he was permitted to transfer to the United States Army after America entered the war. He was commissioned a major and was later promoted to lieutenant colonel. Wounded in the Argonne offensive, he recuperated in Paris. He was discharged in July 1919.

He then organized 200 experienced former United States Army officers to fight on the Polish side in the Polish–Soviet War (1919–1920). He himself participated in the 1920 Battle of Warsaw. For his efforts, he was made a Polish army brigadier general in 1920. He may have crossed paths with fellow American and fighter pilot Merian C. Cooper (better known now as a Hollywood movie producer), who was shot down that same year and became a prisoner of war of the Soviets; later correspondence indicates they were good friends.

In the Greco-Turkish War (1919–1922), he was ostensibly a war correspondent, but biographer Donald McCormick claims he was actually a spy for French Intelligence. It was here that Sweeny met another war correspondent, Ernest Hemingway; they became lifelong friends. (When Hemingway died in 1961, Sweeny served as one of his honorary pallbearers.) He also landed an interview with Turkish leader Kemal Atatürk, and at the personal recommendation of French General Maxime Weygand, became one of Atatürk's military advisors. An October 1923 magazine article describes Sweeny as "now war correspondent of the New York World in the Near East".

thumb|Front page of the Paris edition of Le Petit Journal, August 6, 1925. Translation: "The American volunteer pilots left yesterday for Morocco / Before departure: General Dumesnil gives the American colonel Sweeny a bon voyage toast."
In 1925, he fought in Morocco for the French in the Rif War and recruited World War I veterans for the Escadrille Cherifienne, the 19th Squadron of the Moroccan Aviation Regiment, which was responsible for the bombardment of Chefchaouen. He became the leader of the Sultan of Morocco's air force.

He observed and evaluated the effectiveness of French aircraft in the Spanish Civil War, and was reunited with Hemingway.

In 1939, he recruited and financed American flyers to fight in World War II in France at a time when the United States was still neutral, making his activities a violation of the Neutrality Acts of the 1930s. This earned him the ire of FBI Director J. Edgar Hoover, who tried unsuccessfully to apprehend him. The British, on the other hand, made Sweeny a Royal Air Force reserve captain, group captain temporary group captain, or honorary group captain. Thirty-two of his recruits reached France before the Germans invaded the country in May 1940, though none of them managed to fly while there. Of these, four were killed, 11 were taken prisoner, and five reached England. Meanwhile, his nephew Charles Francis Sweeny was in London persuading the Air Ministry to gather all the Americans currently serving in the RAF, plus any new recruits, into what would become known as the Eagle Squadrons.

Later life
He eventually retired and lived in Salt Lake City, Utah. He died there on February 27, 1963, and was buried at Mount Olivet Cemetery.

References

Further reading

External links
 

1882 births
1963 deaths
American mercenaries
American journalists
American war correspondents
Officers of the French Foreign Legion
United States Army colonels
Recipients of the Legion of Honour
United States Military Academy alumni
People from San Francisco
People from Spokane, Washington
Military personnel from California